Elvis: A Legendary Performer Volume 1 is a compilation album by American singer and musician Elvis Presley issued in 1974 by RCA Records. It features 14 tracks, which includes twelve songs and two interviews with Presley. It was certified Gold on January 8, 1975, Platinum and 2× Platinum on July 15, 1999, and 3× Platinum, by the Recording Industry Association of America (RIAA) on March 8, 2018.

Content
Elvis: A Legendary Performer Volume 1 opens with his first recording from 1954, "That's All Right", the song that started his recording career at Sun Records.

Ultimately, four volumes devoted to Presley  were released over the next decade in RCA's A Legendary Performer series, the only RCA Victor recording artist other than Glenn Miller to have multiple volumes issued in that series. The series is also notable for the first release of several previously  unissued  recordings by Presley, with  each successive volume containing  increasing amounts of  unreleased material. This first volume included previously unissued live performances of several songs from Presley's 1968 TV special, an alternate version of his first known recording for  Sun Records ("I Love You Because"), and the first American release of "Tonight's All Right for Love", previously available only on European pressings of the G.I. Blues album. The two interview recordings were originally issued by RCA Victor in 1958 as the EP, Elvis Sails.

Although RCA Victor had released a few alternate takes of Presley studio recordings in the past—for example, two different takes of the song "Old Shep" from his second LP Elvis from 1956, and two different takes of the song "Lover Doll" from the soundtrack to the film King Creole were released on the official 1958 soundtrack album and the reissue EP King Creole Volume 1 —this was the first time the company began seriously issuing such material, although releases of alternate takes and unissued recordings by Presley would not begin on a large scale until after his death in August, 1977. Elvis: A Legendary Performer Volume 3 issued in November, 1978, consisted almost entirely of previously unreleased recordings.

Track listing

Personnel
 Elvis Presley - lead vocals, rhythm guitar, percussion
 Scotty Moore - lead guitar, rhythm guitar
 Hank Garland - lead guitar
 Bill Black - double bass
 Bob Moore - double bass
 D.J. Fontana - drums, percussion
 Buddy Harman - drums, percussion
 Floyd Cramer - piano
 Alan Fortas - percussion
 Lance LeGault - tambourine
 Charlie Hodge - acoustic rhythm guitar

References

External links

Elvis Presley compilation albums
1974 compilation albums
RCA Records compilation albums